The South Australian Living Artists Festival (SALA, or SALA Festival) is a statewide, open-access visual arts festival which takes place during August in South Australia.

Organisation 

The SALA Festival was established in 1998 as an initiative of the Australian Commercial Galleries Association, SA Branch, to promote and celebrate visual artists in South Australia. Its aim is to extend audiences for living artists in South Australia, with a policy of inclusiveness which allows all artists at any level and working in any medium to be part of the Festival.

Originally called the South Australian Living Artists Week, its name was changed to SALA Festival in 2002.

The SALA Festival is a not-for-profit organisation that relies on government support, private sponsorship and earned income to invest back into South Australian artists.

SALA Festival celebrates 25 year in 2022.

Governance

Chair 
 Paul Greenaway OAM, founding chair, 1998-2007

Festival Awards 
SALA Festival offers a number of prizes to artists and venues.

South Australian Living Artist Publication 
The South Australian Living Artist Publication is an award launched in 1999 as part of the SALA Festival. With funding provided by the South Australian Government, a publication (book) is commissioned and written on a leading South Australian artist or craftsperson with potential for 
national and international promotion and published by Wakefield Press.
The first recipient of the South Australian Living Artist Publication was Annette Bezor. The most recent recipient whose publication will be published in 2023 is Helen Fuller.

South Australian Living Artist Publication recipients  
 Annette Bezor, 2000
 Kathleen Petyarre, 2001
 James Darling, 2001
 Nick Mount, 2002
 Ian W. Abdulla, 2003
 Deborah Paauwe, 2004
Michelle Nikou, 2005
 Aldo Iacobelli, 2006
 Julie Blyfeld, 2007
 Gerry Wedd, 2008
 Angela Valamanesh, 2009
 Khai Liew, 2010
 Hossein Valamanesh, 2011
 Mark Kimber, 2012
 Stephen Bowers, 2013
 Nicholas Folland, 2014
 Giles Bettison, 2015
 Catherine Truman, 2016
 Christopher Orchard, 2017
 Clare Belfrage, 2018
Louise Haselton, 2019
Kirsten Coelho, 2020
Roy Ananda, 2021
Mark Valenzuela, 2022
Helen Fuller, 2023

SALA Awards 
Several prizes are awarded as part of the SALA Festival. Prizes and recipients from notable sponsors are listed below:

2008 
 The Advertiser Contemporary Art Award: Peter Drew
 Core Energy Sculpture Award: Ariel Hassan
 Centre of Creative Photography Emerging Artist Award: Tushar Wahab
 Established Artist Award: Emma Sterling and Dan Monceaux
 Atkins Technicolour Award Photo Based: David Evans
 Non Photographic Medium: Claire Nielsen
 JamFactory Contemporary Craft and Design Award: Sandy Elverd
 SA Life Emerging Artist Winner: Tushar Wahab
 Rip It Up Award: Robin Eley
 Bunka Moving Image Award: Ryan Sims and Ray Meandering

2009 
The Advertiser Business SA Contemporary Art Prize: Heidi Karo
Atkins Technicolour Photographic Award: Danica Gacesa McLean
Centre of Creative Photography Developing Artist Award: Jamie Nuske
Centre of Creative Photography Latent Image Award: Rebecca Whittemore
Core Energy Group Sculpture Award: Amy Joy Watson
JamFactory Contemporary Craft and Design Award: Wesley Harron
Gosia Schild Moving Image Award: Kyraki Maragozdis
Rip It Up Emerging Artist Award: Shannon Poulton
SA Life Young Artist Award: Amy Joy Watson

2010 
 The Advertiser Business SA Contemporary Art Prize: Jennifer Trantor 
 Atkins Technicolour Photographic Award: Alex Frayne
 Centre of Creative Photography Developing Artist Award: Alison Woodward
 Core Energy Group Sculpture Award: Samantha Bell
 Gosia Schild Award for Best New Work in Moving Image Project: Kyraki Maragozdis
 JamFactory Contemporary Craft and Design Award: Ilona Glastonbury 
 Rip It Up Special Art Award: Tutti Visual Arts and Design 
 Rip It Up Young Artist Award for the Best Young Artist: Kirsty Shadiac
 SA Life Young Artist Award: Nic Brown
 Adelaide Film Festival Moving Image Partnership Award: Susan Bruce 
 Adelaide City Council Encouragement Award: Ryan Sims 
 Adelaide Central School of Art Professional Development Award: Angela Black 
 OZ Minerals Copper Sculpture Awards: Chris Ormerod (Metro/Regional), Rachel Young (Upper Spencer Gulf/Far North), Victor Harbor High School (school students)

2011 
 The Advertiser Business SA Contemporary Art Prize: Christine Cholewa
 Atkins Technicolour Photographic Award: Danica Gacesa McLean
 Centre of Creative Photography Developing Artist Award: Pantelli Pyromallis
 Centre of Creative Photography Latent Image Award: Nerissa Stanley
 JamFactory Contemporary Craft and Design Award: Stephanie James Mason
 Statewide Super Artist Opportunity: Swee Wah Yew and Peter Ahrens
 Rip It Up Special Art Award: Community Bridging Services
 Rip It Up Young Artist Award: Rebecca Prince
 SA Life Emerging Artist Award: Carly Snoswell
 Adelaide City Council Encouragement Award: Kyriaki Maragozidis 
 Gosia Schild Award for the Best New Work in the Moving Image Project: Ryan Sims
 Adelaide Central School of Art Professional Development Award: Meaghan Coles
 OZ Minerals Copper Sculpture Award: Mei Sheong Wong

2012 
 The Advertiser Business SA Contemporary Art Award: Christine Cholewa
 Adelaide Central School of Art Professional Development Award: Madison Bycroft
 Adelaide City Council Encouragement Award for Moving Image: Patty Chehade
 Atkins Technicolour Photographic Award for Artists Award Winner: Peter MacDonald
 Centre for Creative Photography Latent Image Award Winner: Lee Hopkins
 JamFactory Contemporary Craft and Design Award Winner: Brenden Scott French
 OZ Minerals Copper Sculpture Award: Nicholas Uhlmann
 Rip It Up Publishing Artist Award for Best Young Artist: Wenjing (Cherica) Zhang
 Statewide Super Artist Opportunity: Donovan Christie
 The Austral Hotel Emerging Artist Award: David Frahm

2013 
 The Advertiser Business SA Contemporary Art Prize: Marc D. Bowden
 Adelaide Central School of Art Professional Development Award: Therese Williams
 Atkins Technicolour Photographic Award: Wayne Griveli
 Centre for Creative Photography Latent Image Award: Gabriella Szondy
 JamFactory Contemporary Craft and Design Award: Kim Thomson
 OZ Minerals Copper Sculpture Award: Warren Pickering and Anna Small
 Rip It Up Publishing Artist Award: Amy Joy Watson
 The Austral Hotel Emerging Artist Award: Jacky Murtaugh

2014 
 The Advertiser Contemporary Art Prize: Henry Jock Walker
 Atkins Technicolour Photographic Award: David Evans
 Centre for Creative Photography Latent Image Award: Bridgette Minuzzo
 JamFactory Contemporary Craft and Design Award: Jennifer Ahrens
 OZ Minerals Copper Sculpture Award: Chris Ormerod
 Rip It Up Publishing Artist Award: Glenn Kestell
 The Austral Hotel Emerging Artist Award: Stuart Templeton
 Adelaide Review Special Art Award: Community Bridging Services
 UnitCare Services Moving Image Award: Madison Bycroft
 Country Arts SA Breaking Ground Award: Morgan Allender

2015 
 The Advertiser Contemporary Art Prize: Jason Sims
 Atkins Technicolour Photographic Award: Gary Sauer-Thompson
 Centre for Creative Photography latent Image Award: Emmaline Zanelli
 OZ Minerals Copper Sculpture Award: Mark Ryan
 Rip It Up Publishing Artist Award: Jessica Clark
 City Rural Emerging Artist Award: Alise Hardy
 Adelaide Review Outsider Art Award: Michelle Willsmore
 UnitCare Services Moving Image Award: Fiona Gardner
 Country Arts SA Breaking Ground Award: Cindy Durant
 Brighton Jetty Classic Sculptures Young Artist Award: Joel Zimmermann and Students of Trinity College Year 10 Art
 Don Dunstan Foundation Award: Selina Wallace

2016 
 The Advertiser Contemporary Art Prize: Julia Robinson
 Atkins Technicolour Photographic Award: Nathan Stolz
 Centre for Creative Photography Latent Image Award: Nathan Stolz
 OZ Minerals Copper Sculpture Award: Mary Ann Santin
 Adelaide Review Young Artist Award: Emmaline Zanelli
 City Rural Emerging Artist Award: Tina Jade Panagaris
 Adelaide Review Outsider Art Award: Scott McCarten
 UnitCare Services Moving Image Award: Ray Harris
 Country Arts SA Breaking Ground Award: Chris De Rosa
 Brighton Jetty Classic Sculptures Young Artist Award: Jess Taylor and Joel Zimmermann
 Don Dunstan Foundation Award: Andrea Malone
 City of Unley Active Ageing Award: Sheila Whittam
 Centennial Park Environment Award: Tobias Staheli

2017 
 The Advertiser Contemporary Art Prize: Julia McInerney
 Atkins Technicolour Photographic Award: Alice Blanch
 Centre for Creative Photography Latent Image Award: Lee Walter
 City Rural Emerging Artist Award: Jane Skeer
 Adelaide Review Outsider Art Award: Len Harvey
 UnitCare Services Moving Image Award: Trent Parke & Narelle Autio
 City of Unley Active Ageing Award: Andrea Malone
 SALA Festival Patron's Art Writer's Award - Andrew Purvis

2018 
 The Advertiser Contemporary Art Award: Kaspar Schmidt Mumm
 UnitCare Services Moving Image Award: Cynthia Schwertsik
 Atkins Technicolour Photographic Award: Emmaline Zanelli
 Centre for Creative Photography Latent Image Award: Brett Hughes
 City Rural Emerging Artist Award: Hannah Vorrath-Pajak
 Adelaide Review Outsider Art Award: Alana Gregory
 City of Unley Active Ageing Award: Chris Webb
 Don Dunstan Foundation Award: Gerry Wedd
 Country Arts SA Breaking Ground Award: Nellie Rankine
 BlueThumb People’s Choice Award: Ellie Kammer
 SALA Festival Patron’s Art Writer’s Award – Melinda Rackham
 Credit Union SA Schools Award Winners: Woodside Primary, St Brigid’s School, South Coast schools collective including Encounter Lutheran College, Investigator College and Victor Harbor High School
 Credit Union SA Schools Award Runner Ups: Elizabeth Grove Primary School, Bowden Brompton Community School and St John’s Grammar School

2019 
 The Advertiser Contemporary Art Award: Derek Sargent with Jess Miley 
 City of Unley Active Ageing Award: Maggie Cecchin 
 UnitCare Services Moving Image Award: Grant Parke
 Atkins Photographic Award: Lee Walter 
 City Rural Emerging Artist Award: Steven Bellosguardo
 Don Dunstan Foundation Award: Sue Webb & Deborah Baldassi
 Centre for Creative Photography Latent Image Award: Joseph Haxan 
 4th Biennial RSASA / SALA Portrait Prize: Kate Kurucz
 City of Onkaparinga Contemporary Curator Award: Steph Cibich 
 Credit Union SA School Awards Winners: St John's Grammar, Riverland Special School, The Heights School and St Gabriel's School
 Credit Union SA School Awards Commendations: Bridgewater Primary School, Woodside Primary School and Bowden Brompton Community School

2020 
 Country Arts SA Breaking Ground Award: Juanella McKenzie 
 City of Adelaide Incubator Award: Alycia Bennett
 UnitCare Services Digital Media Award: Tom Borgas
 City Rural Emerging Artist Award: Amber Cronin
 City of Unley Active Ageing Award: John Freeman
 Don Dunstan Foundation Award: Makeda Duong 
 Hither & Yon Venue Award: She is Pop-up Gallery & Collective Haunt Inc.
 City of Onkaparinga Contemporary Curator Award: Suzanne Close 
 Credit Union SA School Awards Winners: Adelaide High School, Faith Lutheran College, St. John's Grammar School and Wirreanda Secondary School
 Credit Union SA School Awards Commendations: Nuriootpa High School and Walkerville Primary School

2021 
 City of Adelaide Incubator Award: Yoko Kajio
 UnitCare Services Digital Media Award: Maddie Grammatopoulos
 City Rural Emerging Artist Award: Jianzhen 'Shirley' Wu
 City of Unley Active Aging Award: Rosie Field
 The Advertiser Tertiary Student Award: Sam Burke
 Don Dunstan Foundation Award: Tom Phillips
 City of Onkaparinga Contemporary Curator Award: Christina Lauren
 Hither & Yon Venue Awards: Bimbimbie Garden, The Garden Depot
 Credit Union SA School Award Winners: Christies Beach Primary, Littlehampton Primary School, Nuriootpa High School and St Aloysius College
 Credit Union SA School Award Commendations: Pinnacle College, Riverland Special School

2022 
Country Arts SA Breaking Ground Award: Gail Hocking
City of Adelaide Incubator Award: Emmaline Zanelli, Kurt Bosecke & Eloise Holoubek
 UnitCare Services Digital Media Award: Emmaline Zanelli, Kurt Bosecke, & Eloise Holoubek
 The Advertiser Contemporary Art Award: Deborah Prior
 City Rural Emerging Artist Award: Anna Révész 
 City of Unley Active Aging Award: Saxon Rudduck
 Don Dunstan Foundation Award: Allison Chhorn
 City of Onkaparinga Contemporary Curator Award: Sarah Northcott
 Hither & Yon Venue Award: Burra Regional Art Gallery
 SALA Solo Photographic Opportunity: David Hume
 Credit Union SA School Award Winners: Berri Regional Secondary College, Valley View Secondary School, Woodcroft College, Woodville Gardens Primary School
 Credit Union SA School Award Commendations: Christies Beach Primary School, Urrbrae Agricultural High School

Awards 
 Ruby Awards 2017 Award Community or Regional Impact over $100,000: SALA Festival 2016 
 Ruby Awards 2015 Best Event: SALA Festival 2014
Ruby Awards 2006 Community Impact Award: SALA Festival

Statistics

See also
 Adelaide Festival of Arts
 Adelaide Fringe
 Adelaide Film Festival

References

External links 
SALA Festival official website 

Festivals in Adelaide
Arts festivals in Australia
Arts in South Australia